Donoho is a surname. Notable people with the surname include:

David Donoho (born 1957), American statistician
Joe Donoho (born 1985), American soccer player 
Ron Donoho, American journalist and media executive
Todd Donoho (born 1955), American radio and television sportscaster